The Satellite Award for Best Motion Picture is one of the annual awards given to motion pictures by the International Press Academy. The category was gone through several changes since its inception, specially related to the genre of the film awarded.
 From 1996 to 2010, two categories based on genre were presented, Best Drama Film and Best Musical or Comedy Film
 In 2011, the IPA pared down its Satellite nominations in the motion picture categories from 22 to 19 classifications; the change reflects the merger of drama and comedy under a general Best Picture heading, including the Best Actor/Actress headings and the Supporting headings. 
 In 2016 and 2017, two winners were announced within the Best Motion Picture category, one for a major studio film and other for an independent film.
 In 2018 a stand-alone category for independent film was presented.

Since 2018, the two categories based on genre are presented replacing the Best Motion Picture category for the Best Drama Film and Best Musical or Comedy Film categories previously presented.

Winners and nominees

Musical or Comedy (1996–2010, 2018–present)

Drama (1996–2010, 2018–present)

Motion Picture (2011–2015)

Motion Picture (Major/Independent) (2016–2017)

Independent (2018)

See also
 Academy Award for Best Picture
 Golden Globe Award for Best Motion Picture – Musical or Comedy
 Golden Globe Award for Best Motion Picture – Drama
 Critics' Choice Movie Award for Best Picture
 Independent Spirit Award for Best Film

References

External links
 Official website

Film
Awards for best film